Andrew Walls (born 2 September 1993) is a Scottish association footballer who is currently a free agent. He previously played for Raith Rovers in Scottish First Division.

Career
Walls earned a full-time contract with Raith Rovers in June 2010 after progressing through the youth sides. In September 2011 he was part of a Raith side who won the SFL Reserve League Cup defeating Livingston 2–1 in the final.

He made his senior debut on 30 July 2011 as a substitute in a 4–1 victory against Montrose in a Scottish League Cup fixture replacing teammate Brian Graham. Walls was released by Raith in May 2012.

Career statistics
. 

a.  Includes other competitive competitions, including the Scottish Challenge Cup.

References

External links

1993 births
Living people
Footballers from Dundee
Scottish footballers
Scottish Football League players
Raith Rovers F.C. players
Association football midfielders